Symphony No. 10 is the tenth symphony by the American composer Philip Glass.  The work was commissioned by the Orchestre Français des Jeunes and premiered August 9, 2012, with Dennis Russell Davies conducting the Orchestre Français des Jeunes at the Grand Théâtre de Provence in Aix-en-Provence.  The piece had its United Kingdom premiere July 31, 2013 at The Proms in Royal Albert Hall.

Composition
The symphony reworks music originally written as Los paisajes del rio for the Philip Glass Ensemble, premiered at the 2008 Expo Zaragoza.  Due to the famed curse of the ninth, Glass composed the piece before the premiere of his Ninth Symphony.

Instrumentation
The work is scored for piccolo, two flutes, two oboes, three clarinets (second doubling on E-flat clarinet, third doubling on bass clarinet), two bassoons, four French horns, three trumpets, two trombones, bass trombone, tuba, timpani, six  percussionists (chimes, glockenspiel, xylophone, marimbas, triangle, anvil, tamtam, clash cymbals, castanets, wood block, snare drum, tenor drum, bass drum), celesta, piano, harp, and strings (violins I & II, violas, violoncellos, and double basses).

Reception
Reviewing the world premiere at the Grand Théâtre de Provence, Arabella Saer of the Financial Times lauded the symphony, writing:
Andrew Clements of The Guardian later opined, "Its extrovert origins as latter-day fireworks music remain clear, though, as Glass's orchestration, with its brassy edge and martial percussion – lots of snare drum – underlines in Davies's performance."  Pwyll ap Siôn of Gramophone also gave the work moderate praise, writing:

References

 10
Glass 10
2012 compositions
Compositions for symphony orchestra
21st-century classical music